RAF Stafford was a non-flying Royal Air Force station in Stafford, Staffordshire, England.

History
The station was originally established as the home of No. 16 Maintenance Unit in the 1930s. It became home to No 2 Mechanical Transport Squadron in 1958. The RAF Tactical Supply Wing was also formed at RAF Stafford in 1970 and operates still from MOD Stafford.  An RAF Mountain Rescue Team was based at RAF Stafford.

Closure
In April 2004 it was announced that units from RAF Stafford would be moved to RAF Wittering, effectively closing the station. RAF Stafford officially ceased to be an RAF station on 31 March 2006 to become Beacon Barracks. However,  the RAF's "gate guardian" aircraft, a Harrier GR3 (pictured), remains in place.

References

External links

Royal Air Force stations in Staffordshire
RAF Stafford